Devyat Izb (lit. "nine wooden houses") is a rural locality (a village) in Pertsevskoye Rural Settlement, Gryazovetsky District, Vologda Oblast, Russia. The population was 5 as of 2002.

Geography
Devyat Izb is located 12 km north of Gryazovets (the district's administrative centre) by road. Yakovlevka is the nearest locality.

References 

Rural localities in Gryazovetsky District